Drake's or Drakes may refer to:

Companies 
Drake's (haberdashers), a UK haberdashers
 Drakes Bay Oyster Company, American oyster farm and restaurant
Drake's Brewing Company, an American brewery
Drake's Cakes, an American food company
Drakes Supermarkets, a retail chain in Australia

Places 
Drakes Bay, California, United States
Drakes Bay, Costa Rica
 Drakes Creek (disambiguation), multiple locations
Drakes Estero, estuary in California, United States
 Drakes Formation, geologic formation in Kentucky, United States
Drake's Island, an island located south of England
 Drakes Island, Maine, United States
Drake's Leat, a watercourse near Plymouth, England

People 
 Dominic Drakes, Barbadian cricketer
 Jesse Drakes, American jazz trumpet player
 Thomas Drakes, English cricketer
 Vasbert Drakes, West Indian cricketer

Other uses 
Drake's Regiment of Militia, an American army regiment
 Edmonton Drakes, former Canadian baseball team

See also
 Drake (disambiguation)